An epitome is a summary or miniature form.

Epitome may also refer to:

Epitome (film), a 1953 Japanese film
Epitome (album), a 1993 album by saxophonist Odean Pope
Epitome (data processing), a condensed digital representation of statistical properties
Epitome Pictures, a Canadian television production company
Epitome (horse), a Thoroughbred racehorse

See also